The Theo d'Or is a Dutch acting award, given annually to the actress with the most impressive leading role of the theater season. It is awarded by the Vereniging van Schouwburg- en Concertgebouwdirecties (VSCD), the main trade organisation for theaters in The Netherlands. The award itself is a golden medal, currently designed by Eric Claus. It was named after the Dutch actress Theo Mann-Bouwmeester. Its male counterpart is the Louis d'Or, named after Theo's brother, Louis Bouwmeester.

The Theo d'Or is awarded annually, along with the other VSCD stage awards, at the Gala of Dutch Theater in the Stadsschouwburg in Amsterdam.

Jury
The jury is compiled of theater programmers, producers and critics, who have explicitly provided themselves in their relative disciplines. Jurors can take part of a jury for maximal six years. New jurors can be nominated by the jury itself or be appointed by the board of the VSCD.

Award winners

1955: Ank van der Moer 
1956: Ida Wasserman
1957: Myra Ward
1958: Elisabeth Andersen
1959: Ida Wasserman
1960: not awarded
1961: Ellen Vogel
1962: Anny de Lange
1963: not awarded
1964: Ank van der Moer
1965: Annet Nieuwenhuijzen
1966: Elisabeth Andersen
1967: Anny de Lange
1968: Andrea Domburg
1969: Trins Snijders
1970: Christine Ewert
1971: Lies Franken
1972: Loudi Nijhoff (refused)
1973: Petra Laseur
1974: Sacha Bulthuis
1975: Christine Ewert
1975: Annet Nieuwenhuijzen
1976: Anne Wil Blankers
1978: Mary Dresselhuys
1979: Caro van Eyck
1980: Josée Ruiter
1981: Petra Laseur
1982: Marjon Brandsma
1983: not awarded
1984: Elisabeth Andersen
1985: Anne Wil Blankers
1986: Henny Orri
1987: Viviane De Muynck
1988: Sigrid Koetse
1989: Andrea Domburg
1990: Katelijne Damen
1991: Catherine ten Bruggencate
1992: Els Dottermans
1993: Sacha Bulthuis
1994: Anneke Blok
1995: Ilse Uitterlinden
1996: Sylvia Poorta
1997: Trudy de Jong
1998: Marlies Heuer
1999: Marieke Heebink
2000: Marie-Louise Stheins
2001: Ria Eimers
2002: Betty Schuurman
2003: Ariane Schluter
2004: Ariane Schluter
2005: Bien de Moor
2006: Elsie de Brauw
2007: Will van Kralingen
2008: Chris Nietvelt
2009: Lineke Rijxman
2010: Maria Kraakman
2011: Elsie de Brauw
2012: Marlies Heuer
2013: Halina Reijn
2014: Abke Haring
2015: Marieke Heebink
2016: Wine Dierickx
2017: Romana Vrede

References

External links
 Homepage of the VSCD stage awards
 Wiki Theaterencyclopedie

Awards established in 1955
Dutch awards
Theatre acting awards
1955 establishments in the Netherlands